William de Montibus (or William de Monte; d. 1213) was a theologian and teacher. He travelled to Paris in the 1160s, where he studied under Peter Comestor, eventually opening his own school on the Montagne Sainte-Geneviève. He was appointed by Hugh of Lincoln as master of the cathedral school in Lincoln, England in the 1180s, where his lectures drew students from around the country. He was also chancellor of the cathedral by 1194, and remained in both positions until his death in 1213. He was the instructor of Alexander Neckam in Paris, and in Lincoln taught Samuel Presbiter and Richard of Wetheringsett.

Bibliography

References 

Year of birth unknown
1213 deaths
12th-century English Roman Catholic theologians
13th-century English Roman Catholic theologians
Medieval Paris
13th-century Latin writers